Frank Dean may refer to:

Frank Dean, a character in Marvel Comics
Frank L. and Mabel H. Dean House
Frank Dean (musician), see Shakill's II

See also
Frankie Dean (disambiguation)